Kebek Sultan Oghlan (died c. 1472) was Khan of eastern Moghulistan (Uyghurstan) from 1468 or 1469 until his death. He was the only son of Dost Muhammad.

When Dost Muhammad died, Kebek Sultan, who was a child, was carried off by some of his supporters to Turpan, while Yunus Khan captured Aksu. After only a few years of rule, he was betrayed by his followers and was killed, his head being brought to Yunus Khan. The Khan became angry at the murder of his great-nephew and put those responsible to death.

Chagatai khans
Uyghurs
1472 deaths
Year of birth unknown